Rudolf Reiff (1901–1961) was a German stage and film actor.

Filmography

External links

1901 births
1961 deaths
German male film actors
German male stage actors
Actors from Leipzig
20th-century German male actors